Panchayat (Nepali:पंचायत) is a 2017 Nepalese drama social film, directed and written by Shivam Adhikari and produced by Sushanta Shrestha and Sankhar Shrestha, under the banner Kalawati Films with NepalFlix and Hetauda Movies. The film is based on panchayat system in Nepal and it is mainly aimed at women and the film is set in 1974. The film stars Neeta Dhungana in the lead role along with Saroj Khanal, Rupa Rana, Ganesh Giti, Jahanwi Basnet and Bishal Pahari. It was selected as the Nepalese entry for the Best Foreign Language Film at the 91st Academy Awards, but it was not nominated.

Plot 
The film is based on Nepalese Panchayat system in Nepal while in Nepalese king Birendra of Nepal's times.

Cast 
 Neeta Dhungana as Girl
 Saroj Khanal as Kaji
 Rupa Rana
 Ganesh Giti
 Jahanwi Basnet
 Bishal Pahari

Awards

See also
 List of submissions to the 91st Academy Awards for Best Foreign Language Film
 List of Nepalese submissions for the Academy Award for Best Foreign Language Film

References

10. Neeta Dhungana & Saroj Khanal starrer Panchayat to represent Nepal at Oscars 2019 glamournepal.net

External links
 

2017 drama films
2010s Nepali-language films
Nepalese drama films
Cultural depictions of Nepalese women